Packwood Creek is one of the four main creeks that flow through the city of Visalia and the surrounding communities. It is a distributary of the Kaweah River.

History
Packwood Creek was named after Elisa Packwood.

See also
Cameron Creek
Mill Creek (Tulare County)
St. John's River (California)

References

Rivers of Tulare County, California
Geography of Visalia, California
Rivers of Northern California